The Volvo V50 is the station wagon version of the Volvo S40 small family car first unveiled at the 2003 Bologna Motor Show, both assembled at Ghent, Belgium. Sharing the Ford C1 platform with the European Ford Focus and the Mazda 3, the V50 featured interior "theatre" lighting, a floating center stack and "Volvo Intelligent Vehicle Architecture".

Within the United States, Volvo limited sales of the V50 PZEV cars to states where it was required, including California, Florida, Vermont, Connecticut, Arizona, Maryland, Massachusetts, Pennsylvania, New York, Oregon, Maine, New Jersey, Rhode Island, New Mexico and Washington.

Volvo Cars Special Vehicle produced a concept car based on the V50, the V50 SV, whose engine produces , and debuted at the 2004 Specialty Equipment Market Association trade show in Las Vegas, Nevada.

History 

For the model year of 2008, the V50 received revised front styling, minor modifications to the interior, optional active xenon headlights, audio systems, increased power and torque of the T5 engine, availability of the D5, with a six speed manual and a 1.8 Flexifuel engine.

For 2009, the V50 T5 was available in the United States, only as an automatic AWD model with the R-Design trim package, and within Europe with both manual and automatic options. As of the model year of 2010, the D5 inline five diesel engine was no longer available; only the 1.6l and 2.0l diesel inline four units could be specified.

In 2010, the new, larger, circular Volvo logo appeared on the front grille, in the United States, a manual transmission was briefly available with the T5 AWD version. In North America the naturally aspirated five cylinder engine, all wheel drive, and manual transmission were all dropped for the model year of 2011, leaving only the automatic, front wheel drive T5 in base and R-Design trims. The model year of 2011 was the last for the V50 in the United States and Canada.

V50 sales 

Total produced: 519,007 from 2003 to 2012 (as of 31 December 2012)

Engines

See also
 Volvo S40
 Volvo P1 platform

Notes

References 
 "The all-new Volvo V50", a Volvo Cars North America news release
 "SEMA 2004: Hot-blooded Volvo V50 SV Concept Car Debuts at 2004 SEMA"

V50
Compact cars
Station wagons
Front-wheel-drive vehicles
All-wheel-drive vehicles
Ford C1 platform
Cars introduced in 2004
2010s cars
Partial zero-emissions vehicles

sv:Volvo S40#V50